Chakarov Island is the ice-covered island 2.18 km long in southwest–northeast direction and 600 m wide in the Barcroft group of Biscoe Islands. Its surface area is 92 ha.

The feature is named after Danail Chakarov, Director of the International and EU Law Directorate, Ministry of Foreign Affairs of Bulgaria responsible for Antarctica and member of the Antarctic Place-names Commission since 2013.

Location
British mapping in 1976.

Maps
 British Antarctic Territory. Scale 1:200000 topographic map. DOS 610 Series, Sheet W 66 66. Directorate of Overseas Surveys, UK, 1976
 Antarctic Digital Database (ADD). Scale 1:250000 topographic map of Antarctica. Scientific Committee on Antarctic Research (SCAR). Since 1993, regularly upgraded and updated

See also
 List of Antarctic and subantarctic islands

Notes

References
 Chakarov Island. SCAR Composite Gazetteer of Antarctica
 Bulgarian Antarctic Gazetteer. Antarctic Place-names Commission. (details in Bulgarian, basic data in English)

External links
 Chakarov Island. Adjusted Copernix satellite image

Islands of the Biscoe Islands
Bulgaria and the Antarctic